Vagadheeswari (pronounced vāgadheeśwari) is a rāgam in Carnatic music (musical scale of South Indian classical music). It is the 34th melakarta rāgam (parent scale) in the 72 melakarta rāgam system of Carnatic music. It is called Bhogachhāyānāţa in Muthuswami Dikshitar school of Carnatic music.

Structure and Lakshana

It is the 4th rāgam in the 6th chakra Rutu. The mnemonic name is Rutu-Bhu. The mnemonic phrase is sa ru gu ma pa dhi ni. Its  structure (ascending and descending scale) is as follows (see swaras in Carnatic music for details on below notation and terms):
: 
: 

As  is a  rāgam, by definition it is a sampoorna rāgam (has all seven notes in ascending and descending scale).

Janya rāgams 
Vagadheeshwari has a few minor janya rāgams (derived scales) associated with it, of which Magadhi and Mohanāngi are occasionally heard. See List of janya rāgams for full list of rāgams associated with Vagadheeswari.

Compositions
Here are a few common compositions sung in concerts, set to Vagadheeshwari.
 Varna Vagadheeshwari Raga SudheyoLu... by Sri. C Honnappa Bhagavatar, a Kannada theatre artist, film actor, producer, composer and singer.
Nanninda Naane Janisi By Kanakadasa
Paramatmudu by Thyagaraja
Bhogachhaaye Naatakapriye by Muthuswami Dikshitar
Vani Vagadheeshwari
Pranamaamyaham by BalamuralikrishnavAgadheeswari saradE T. Sreenidhi
Kamala Nayana Jagadeeshwara a composition of Swathi Thirunal Rama Varma 
Nadanu Santhana a composition of Koteeswara Iyer

Tamil Film Songs

Related rāgams
This section covers the theoretical and scientific aspect of this rāgam.

Vagadheeshwari's notes when shifted using Graha bhedam, yields 2 other minor melakarta rāgams, namely, Naganandini and Bhavapriya. Graha bhedam is the step taken in keeping the relative note frequencies same, while shifting the shadjam to the next note in the rāgam. For further details and an illustration refer Graha bhedam on Naganandini.

Notes

References

Melakarta ragas